Richard William Davenport Legh, 3rd Baron Newton DL, JP (18 November 1888 – 11 June 1960) was a Baron in the Parliament of the United Kingdom.

Life
Legh was the son of the British diplomat and Conservative politician
Thomas Wodehouse Legh, 2nd Baron Newton PC, DL His grandfather, William John Legh, 1st Baron Newton , was a British Conservative politician who was raised to the peerage as Baron Newton, of Newton-in-Makerfield in the County Palatine of Lancaster.

Newton was educated at Eton and Christ Church, Oxford. He was an attaché for the British Embassy at Istanbul then Vienna. He served during the First World War with the Lancashire Hussars. Later he was Honorary Colonel of the 7th Battalion, The Cheshire Regiment. During the Second World War he served at the War Office.

In 1914, he married Helen Meysey-Thompson (d. 1958), 2nd daughter of the 1st Baron Knaresborough: they had three sons. His wife died in 1958.

Arms

References 

1888 births
1960 deaths
Lancashire Hussars officers
British Army personnel of World War I
Barons in the Peerage of the United Kingdom
People educated at Eton College
Alumni of Christ Church, Oxford
People from Cheshire
Deputy Lieutenants
English justices of the peace